Jared Crouch (born 5 March 1978) is a former Australian football player with the Sydney Swans of the Australian Football League (AFL), who is colloquially known as "Crouchie" to Swans fans and the media. He currently serves as a development coach at the Sydney Swans.

Having played for Norwood in the South Australian National Football League (SANFL), Crouch was selected by Sydney in the first round of the 1995 AFL Draft. He did not make his senior debut until 1998, when he was called up to play against Collingwood in Round 7, having been originally selected as an emergency for that match. He played in every game for the rest of the season, earning a Rising Star Award nomination, and he did not miss a game in the subsequent seven years.

Crouch is notable for winning the 2002 AFL sprint.

Crouch's first serious injury occurred in the first match of the 2004 International Rules series (played after the AFL season had ended) when he broke a shoulder and it looked like his unbroken run in the AFL would come to an end. However, Crouch was fit to play in the first game of the 2005 AFL season and played every game in Sydney's premiership-winning season. His run finally ended when he was unavailable for Round 13 of the 2006 AFL season. His 194 consecutive games from his debut is an AFL record, and also places him fourth on the AFL list for consecutive games generally. He was overtaken by team-mate Brett Kirk in 2010.

Crouch usually played in the back pocket, where he kept many well-known opponents quiet. His consistency and professionalism saw him in the top 10 of the Swans' best and fairest count six years in a row, but his only recognition from outside the club was selection in the International Rules team that played Ireland in 2003 and 2004.

Crouch announced his retirement from football at the end of the 2009 AFL season.

Statistics

|- style="background-color: #EAEAEA"
! scope="row" style="text-align:center" | 1998
|style="text-align:center;"|
| 28 || 18 || 0 || 1 || 96 || 80 || 176 || 15 || 40 || 0.0 || 0.1 || 5.3 || 4.4 || 9.8 || 0.8 || 2.2
|-
! scope="row" style="text-align:center" | 1999
|style="text-align:center;"|
| 28 || 23 || 6 || 5 || 190 || 133 || 323 || 36 || 51 || 0.3 || 0.2 || 8.3 || 5.8 || 14.0 || 1.6 || 2.2
|- style="background:#eaeaea;"
! scope="row" style="text-align:center" | 2000
|style="text-align:center;"|
| 28 || 22 || 4 || 7 || 180 || 111 || 291 || 43 || 40 || 0.2 || 0.3 || 8.2 || 5.0 || 13.2 || 2.0 || 1.8
|-
! scope="row" style="text-align:center" | 2001
|style="text-align:center;"|
| 28 || 23 || 6 || 5 || 187 || 143 || 330 || 54 || 59 || 0.3 || 0.2 || 8.1 || 6.2 || 14.3 || 2.3 || 2.6
|- style="background:#eaeaea;"
! scope="row" style="text-align:center" | 2002
|style="text-align:center;"|
| 28 || 22 || 4 || 3 || 171 || 113 || 284 || 31 || 65 || 0.2 || 0.1 || 7.8 || 5.1 || 12.9 || 1.4 || 3.0
|-
! scope="row" style="text-align:center" | 2003
|style="text-align:center;"|
| 28 || 24 || 6 || 2 || 153 || 90 || 243 || 37 || 94 || 0.3 || 0.1 || 6.4 || 3.8 || 10.1 || 1.5 || 3.9
|- style="background:#eaeaea;"
! scope="row" style="text-align:center" | 2004
|style="text-align:center;"|
| 28 || 24 || 8 || 9 || 177 || 142 || 319 || 38 || 86 || 0.3 || 0.4 || 7.4 || 5.9 || 13.3 || 1.6 || 3.6
|-
! scope="row" style="text-align:center" | 2005
|style="text-align:center;"|
| 28 || 26 || 8 || 2 || 180 || 143 || 323 || 51 || 72 || 0.3 || 0.1 || 6.9 || 5.5 || 12.4 || 2.0 || 2.8
|- style="background:#eaeaea;"
! scope="row" style="text-align:center" | 2006
|style="text-align:center;"|
| 28 || 12 || 3 || 7 || 94 || 54 || 148 || 37 || 37 || 0.3 || 0.6 || 7.8 || 4.5 || 12.3 || 3.1 || 3.1
|-
! scope="row" style="text-align:center" | 2007
|style="text-align:center;"|
| 28 || 8 || 3 || 0 || 63 || 32 || 95 || 17 || 18 || 0.4 || 0.0 || 7.9 || 4.0 || 11.9 || 2.1 || 2.3
|- style="background:#eaeaea;"
! scope="row" style="text-align:center" | 2008
|style="text-align:center;"|
| 28 || 7 || 1 || 1 || 65 || 36 || 101 || 13 || 19 || 0.1 || 0.1 || 9.3 || 5.1 || 14.4 || 1.9 || 2.7
|-
! scope="row" style="text-align:center" | 2009
|style="text-align:center;"|
| 28 || 14 || 2 || 2 || 89 || 57 || 146 || 31 || 40 || 0.1 || 0.1 || 6.4 || 4.1 || 10.4 || 2.2 || 2.9
|- class="sortbottom"
! colspan=3| Career
! 223
! 51
! 44
! 1645
! 1134
! 2779
! 403
! 621
! 0.2
! 0.2
! 7.4
! 5.1
! 12.5
! 1.8
! 2.8
|}

References

External links

Sydney Swans site player profile

Sydney Swans players
Sydney Swans Premiership players
1978 births
Living people
Norwood Football Club players
Australian rules footballers from South Australia
Australia international rules football team players
One-time VFL/AFL Premiership players